Berkshire Publishing Group LLC was founded in 2000 by editor and author Karen Christensen and anthropologist David Levinson as an academic reference book producer, developing encyclopedias for Scribners, Routledge, Sage, Macmillan, H.W. Wilson, and ABC-CLIO. The company became an independent imprint in 2005, with the launch of Berkshire Encyclopedia of World History, edited by William H. McNeill, Jerry H. Bentley, David Christian, et al. In 2009, it began publishing individual course titles as well as major encyclopedias. The company is owned by Karen Christensen and operates internationally from Great Barrington, Massachusetts.

Berkshire offers print and online publications on world history, international relations, sports, community, religion and society, popular culture and environmental issues. The publications focus on global perspectives: while many reference publishers and free online sources focus on the "who, what, when, and where" structure for presenting a topic, Berkshire specializes in providing resources from expert contributors who probe for deeper context and analysis, thereby helping to explain how and why.

Berkshire also claims to make special efforts in its reference titles to bring the work of acclaimed scholars to a wide general audience and to high school students.

The company publishes the Dictionary of Chinese Biography, Berkshire Encyclopedia of China, the Berkshire Encyclopedia of Sustainability, and the Berkshire Encyclopedia of World History., as well as Patterns of Global Terrorism.

References

External links
  "Big Big History, Small Press" in Publishers Weekly, September 24, 2014.
  "Don’t Steal This Book" by Karen Christensen in Library Journal Reviews, June 29, 2012.
  "An Interview with Berkshire Publishing," October 23, 2012.
  Interview with Karen Christensen in Library Journal, "It’s The Content, Stupid!”: "[Berkshire's] catalog is growing slowly but steadily, covering hard-to-do subjects and targeting both a scholarly and a popular audience," October 2008.
  Interview with Karen Christensen in Publishers Weekly, "Berkshire Publishing Goes to China," July 2008.
  Interview with Karen Christensen and Steve Hibbard in Publishers Weekly, May 2004.

Book publishing companies based in Massachusetts
Publishing companies established in 1995